Tuyu Township is a township in Lan County, Lüliang, Shanxi, China. , it has eight villages under its administration:
Tuyu Village
Xituyu Village
Dianshang Village
Qingshuihe Village
Chenjiazhuang Village
Dingziping Village
Huqinshe Village
Huangqian Village

References 

Township-level divisions of Shanxi
Lan County